Nippes (French) or Nip (Haitian Creole) is one of the ten departments (the highest-level political subdivisions) of Haiti located in southern Haiti. It is the most recently created department, having been split from Grand'Anse in 2003. The capital of the department is Miragoâne.

History

Haitian Period
Being created from Grand'Anse most of Nippes' history is similar to Grand'Anse's.

Nippes during the Haitian Revolution played a big role with marron troops led by notably Plymouth a Jamaican later on was in Haiti.

Independence
Étienne Gérin from Miragwàn is a signatory of the Haitian Declaration of Independence.
During the Haitian Civil war between Pétion and Henry 1st, André Rigaud came back to Haiti from France and was disappointed by Pétion's laissez-faire politics and created a de facto republic, the Meridional Republic of Haiti and the Miragoanes bridge was the limit between those two republics.

Geography
The department is bordered to the north by the Gulf of Gonave, to the west the Grand'Anse Department , south by the South Department and to the east by the Ouest Department.

The Nippes River is the most important of the department and one of the most important in the country.

Nippes has one of the biggest and most well-preserved bays in Haiti. The Baradères Bay is formed by the Baradères Peninsula and protects multiple minor islands and cays like Picoulet and Corny Island.

Part of the Miragoanes Lake is shared between Nippes and West Departement is the biggest natural freshwater lake in Haiti.

Nippes has many minor islands with one of the biggest cay being the Rochelois located 15 km offshore. The cay has a potential for land reclamation in Haiti.

Economy
Nippes has great mining potential in bauxite since the town of Miragoanes had a major bauxite plant operated by Reynold's company.

Nippes has an agriculture and fishing industry with the lake having a potential for pisciculture. 

Nippes is a commerce hub since the Miragoanes Port is one of the biggest ports in the South.

Transportation
The RN2 (national road system) passes through Nippes going to Les Cayes and making it the bridge between 2 departments. Another one is proposed to connect it to Grand'Anse.

Miragoanes is the major port in the town and the department has no airport.

Administrative divisions
The department of Nippes is subdivided into three arrondissements (districts), which are further subdivided into eleven communes (the equivalent of a city or municipality).

 Anse-à-Veau Arrondissement
 Anse-à-Veau
 Arnaud
 L'Asile
 Petit-Trou-de-Nippes
 Plaisance-du-Sud
 Baradères Arrondissement
 Baradères
 Grand-Boucan
 Miragoâne Arrondissement
 Miragoâne
 Fonds-des-Nègres
 Paillant
 Petite-Rivière-de-Nippes

References

 
Departments of Haiti
States and territories established in 2003
2003 establishments in Haiti